Barrio de los Sapos, or Callejón de los Sapos (English: "alley of the frogs"), is a tourist attraction in the city of Puebla's historic center, in Puebla, Mexico.

References

External links
 

Historic centre of Puebla
Tourist attractions in Puebla